Små ord av kärlek (Small Words of Love) is a studio album by Swedish singer Emilia Rydberg, released on 18 April 2007. The album was her first sung in Swedish rather than English.

Track listing
Var minut (Hvert minut)
Du är
En sång om kärleken (En sang om kærlighed)
Det är inte det du säger
Säg du är säker
Inget svar
Lär mig att älska
Ord som bara du får höra
Sommardag
Jag ser det klart
Fotspår i snön
Små ord av kärlek
Var minut ("Hvert minut") (radio edit)
Det är inte det du säger (Peo de Pitte nightshift remix)

Personnel
Emilia Rydberg - vocals
Tue West - guitar, drums, bass, keyboard
Peo Häggström - keyboard
Pär Lönn - keyboard, guitar, programme
Peter Nordahl - grand piano, piano
Jan Lysdahl - bas, guitar, keyboard, drums, percussion

Charts

References 

2007 albums
Emilia Rydberg albums
Swedish-language albums
Universal Music Group albums